Titanoptilus procerus is a moth of the family Pterophoridae. It is known from Africa.

References

Pterophorinae
Moths described in 1969
Moths of Africa